Senator Becker may refer to:

George Loomis Becker (1829–1904), Minnesota State Senate
Leonard F. Becker (1920–1991), Illinois State Senate
Randi Becker (born 1948), Washington State Senate
Vaneta Becker (born 1949), Indiana State Senate